Oreste Zaccarelli
  Adilson Zaccari
  Rune Zalle
  Andrea Zambotti
  Jordan Zamora
  Mohamad Zamri Baba
  Massimo Zanarini
  Rene Zanatta
  Germano Zanetti
  Lorenzo Zanetti
  Vincenzo Zanzi
  Ramon Zapater
  Andrea Zappa
  Daniel Zarapico
  Johann Zarco
  Mario Zarco
  Moyd Yaser Zarzar
  Pablo Zeballos
  Marco Zecchi
  Koen Zeelen
  Wilco Zeelenberg
  Mario Zehetner
  Rudolf Zeller
  Walter Zeller
  Johann Zemsauer
  Kai Zentner
  Silvio Cesar Zequim
  Leon Ziesing
  Giovanni Zigiotto
  Sigi Zilmann
  Marcus Zimmermann
  Robert Zimmermann
  Uwe Zimmermann
  Luigi Zinzani
  Willem Zoet
  Giampiero Zubani
  Patrik Zupancic

 Z